Manel Martínez Fernández (born 3 November 1973), known simply as Manel, is a Spanish former professional footballer who played as a centre-forward.

During his extensive career, he was mainly associated to Logroñés.

Club career
Born in Ripollet, Barcelona, Catalonia, Manel started his career with local CE Sabadell FC, signing for CD Logroñés in 1995 and scoring 27 Segunda División goals in his first year, with La Liga promotion. In the following season the Riojan side were relegated again, but he proceeded to add a further 44 goals over the next three second-tier campaigns, being one of the club's all-time best.

Manel then moved between RCD Espanyol (appearing rarely) and Sporting de Gijón in the following seasons. He also had a brief spell abroad with Derby County, scoring three times in 16 competitive games including twice in a 5–1 home rout of Preston North End in the Football League Championship.

Returning home in May 2004, Manel successively represented CF Badalona, Sabadell, UD Ibiza-Eivissa and Lorca Deportiva CF. After retiring in 2009, having totalled 239 matches in the two top divisions of Spanish football with 96 goals, he joined UE Sant Andreu – also in his native region – as a youth coach.

References

External links

1973 births
Living people
People from Vallès Occidental
Sportspeople from the Province of Barcelona
Spanish footballers
Footballers from Catalonia
Association football forwards
La Liga players
Segunda División players
Segunda División B players
CE Sabadell FC footballers
CD Logroñés footballers
RCD Espanyol footballers
Sporting de Gijón players
CF Badalona players
Lorca Deportiva CF footballers
English Football League players
Derby County F.C. players
Spanish expatriate footballers
Expatriate footballers in England
Spanish expatriate sportspeople in England